was a Japanese business tycoon and pharmacist and cosmetician), who was the head of Apothecary Shiseidō (which in 1927 would be incorporated as Shiseidō Company, Ltd.) and .   

Arinobu Fukuhara, is known internationally because of the Arinobu Fukuhara House at Hakone, which Frank Lloyd Wright designed in 1918 as a Prairie-style vacation villa for the extended Fukuhara family.

Born in Awa, Chiba-ken, he rose in due course to become Chief Pharmacist of the Imperial Japanese Navy. In retirement, he embarked on a second career which would bring fame and fortune. He was also president of the Aikoko Insurance Company.

Family patriarch 
His sons became quintessential mobo, or "modern boys"—the sobriquet coined to describe the young, sophisticated, up-to-date young men who frequented the fashionable Ginza district in the late 1920s—and they shared a fascination and persistent attraction to photography as an art form. The Fukuharas helped to bring photography into the mainstream of Japanese modernism. The organization was a major pre-war influence on Japanese photography and still exists today despite a temporary dissolution during the years of the Pacific War.

His grandson, olympic alpine skier,  continues this family tradition of fostering the development of Japanese photography.  He has been director of the Tokyo Metropolitan Museum of Photography since his appointment by Tokyo Governor Shintarō Ishihara in 2000.

Shiseido 

As Shiseido has grown to become an international cosmetics giant, the company has managed to avoid some of the pitfalls and problems which have attended generational transitions in other successful family businesses.<ref>Kenyon
-Rouvinez, Denise. (2002). [https://books.google.com/books?id=AbfTcruXZnAC&pg=PA87&lpg=PA87&dq=arinobu+fukuhara&source=web&ots=RjONsarzz5&sig=e5D8PYxnV07PQWPbzH1RHYBZo4Y&hl=en#PPA89,M1 "Sharing Wisdom, Building Values: Letters from Family Business Owners to their Successors, p. 89.]</ref>  For example, Arinobu's grandson, Yoshiharu Fukuhara, joined Shiseido immediately after receiving his B.A. in economics from Keio University, Tokyo, in 1953. He was appointed president and CEO of Shiseido in 1987, then chairman of the board in 1997 and honorary chairman in 2001.

Three Fukuhara leaders in the Shiseido hierarchy were:
 1st president: Fukuhara, Shinzo—son of company founder
 2nd president: Fukuhara, Nobuyoshi—younger brother of company's 1st president 
 3rd president: Fukuhana, Yoshibaru—son of company's 2nd president

 Japan Pharmaceutical Association 
During his administration, JPA applied for and obtained approval from the Japanese government to become what was known as a "corporate juridical person" (public corporation).

 Arinobu Fukuhara House 

The commissioned house was designed and built in 1920, but the site near a hot spring left the building vulnerable to the cataclysmic 1923 Great Kantō earthquake which collapsed it.

 Notes 

 References 
 Kramer, Eric Mark. (2003.  The Emerging Monoculture: Assimilation and the "Model Minority". Westport, Connecticut: Prager Publishers.   (cloth)
 Storrer, William Allin. The Frank Lloyd Wright Companion''. University Of Chicago Press, 2006,  (S.207)

External links 
 Shisheido Net-TV: "Photo Exhibition of "Poets of Light" -Fukuhara Shinzo, Nobutatsu, Nobuyoshi" (3 mins.)

1848 births
1924 deaths
People from Chiba Prefecture
Frank Lloyd Wright buildings
Japanese businesspeople
Japanese pharmacists
Presidents of the Japan Pharmaceutical Association